BAAL novo  is a theatre in Offenburg, Baden-Württemberg, Germany.

Theatres in Baden-Württemberg